Hendley is both an English surname and a given name. Notable people with the name include:

Surname:
Bob Hendley (born 1939), American baseball player
Charles J. Hendley (1881-1962), American teacher and union leader
Daisy Hendley (1893–1975), American journalist and author
Fiona Hendley, British actress and Christian speaker
Walter Hendley (disambiguation)

Given name:
Hendley S. Bennett (1807–1891), American politician

See also
Hendley, Nebraska, village in Nebraska, United States

English-language surnames